In mathematics, Bôcher's theorem is either of two theorems named after the American mathematician Maxime Bôcher.

Bôcher's theorem in complex analysis

Furthermore, if C1 and C2 are two disjoint circular 

Bôcher's theorem for harmonic functions
In the theory of harmonic functions, Bôcher's theorem states that a positive harmonic function in a punctured domain (an open domain minus one point in the interior) is a linear combination of a harmonic function in the unpunctured domain with a scaled fundamental solution for the Laplacian in that domain.

See also
 Marden's theorem

External links

  (Review of Joseph L. Walsh's book.)

Theorems in complex analysis
Harmonic functions